Melvin Joseph Maas (May 14, 1898 – April 13, 1964) was a U.S. Representative from Minnesota and decorated Major General of the United States Marine Corps Reserve during World War II.

Early years
Melvin Joseph Maas was born in Duluth, Minnesota, May 14, 1898. He moved with his parents to St. Paul, Minnesota, in 1898. Educated in the public schools, he enlisted the U.S. Marine Corps on April 6, 1917, as a private. He underwent flying training course and was designated Naval aviator in the Marine Corps. He served for brief period in Haiti and during World War I, Maas flew reconnaissance missions over the Atlantic Ocean, while stationed on Azores.

Political career

After the War, Maas served with the Marine Corps until 1925, when he received a Marine Corps commission and left active service, subsequently transferred to the Marine Corps Reserve. During that time, he also finished his studies at St. Thomas College at St. Paul and graduated in 1919. Maas later also attended the University of Minnesota at Minneapolis and subsequently joined his brothers in the insurance business.

During Prohibition, Maas became involved in the anti-Prohibition platform, calling for the modification of Prohibition and allowing beer and wine drinking. He subsequently ran for Congress in 1926 and defeated incumbent Oscar Keller. He became the youngest member of Congress at age twenty-eight on November 2, 1926. Maas was subsequently elected as a Republican to the 70th, 71st, and 72nd Congresses (March 4, 1927 – March 3, 1933). He ran unsuccessfully for renomination in 1932.

A Gunman in the House Gallery

On December 13, 1932, a 25-year-old department store clerk Marlin Kemmerer from Allentown, Pennsylvania, pulled a gun in the House visitors' gallery and demanded to be allowed to address the House in the matter of nation's economic depression.

As members fled the chamber, Maas stood his ground and shouted to the man that no one was allowed to speak in the House while carrying a weapon and demanded that he throw it down. The man did so, was promptly arrested, and escorted from the House Chamber by police. For this act of courage, Maas received the Carnegie Medal.

Maas was re-elected to the 74th, 75th, 76th, 77th, and 78th Congresses (January 3, 1935 – January 3, 1945). During the 1930s, Maas served as Commander of Reserve Marine Squadron in Minneapolis, Minnesota.

World War II

During the World War II, Maas was recalled to the active service as Colonel and assigned to the staff of admiral William Halsey Jr. in summer 1941. He was later transferred to the staff of vice admiral Frank J. Fletcher, commander of Task Force 17. Maas later participated in the Solomon Islands campaign with that unit.

He was later transferred to the staff of South West Pacific Area Commander, general Douglas MacArthur, where he was appointed Marine Corps observer. Maas served under MacArthur in Australia and later participated in New Guinea campaign.

During the final phase of Battle of Milne Bay at the beginning of September 1942, Maas volunteered as observer and auxiliary gunner of the bomber plane for reconnaissance mission. During the eight hours lasting flight, he helped to disable enemy airdrome and participated in dropping of food and supplies to the isolated US Army outpost. For his efforts during the mission, Maas was decorated by the army with the Silver Star on September 3, 1942.

Maas continued to serve in the South Pacific until fall 1942, when he was ordered back to the United States for further duty in Congress. He was an unsuccessful candidate for reelection in 1944 to the 79th Congress and returned to active duty with the Marine Corps. He later participated in the Battle of Okinawa and was appointed Awasa Air Base commander in May 1945. In this capacity, Maas was decorated with the Legion of Merit with Combat "V" for his efforts as base commander. He was subsequently wounded by an enemy bomb in the face. This caused permanent damage of his optic nerve that later led to his total blindness.

Postwar career

Maas was special advisor to the House Naval Affairs Committee in 1946. From 1947 to 1951, he was assistant to the chairman of the board of the Sperry Corporation in New York City. He retired from the Marine Corps on August 1, 1952, at the rank of major general.

In 1949, he became a member of the President's Committee on Employment of the Physically Handicapped; he served as chairman from 1954 to 1964. He had been stricken with total blindness in August 1951.

Maas was a resident of Chevy Chase, Maryland, until his death in Bethesda, Maryland, on April 13, 1964. He is buried in Arlington National Cemetery.

Decorations
Here is the ribbon bar of Major General Melvin J. Maas:

Papers

Correspondence, reports, photographs, diaries, and professional papers are available for research use.

References

External links 

 Melvin Maas in MNopedia, the Minnesota Encyclopedia 

1898 births
1964 deaths
People from Chevy Chase, Maryland
Politicians from Duluth, Minnesota
Politicians from Saint Paul, Minnesota
Military personnel from Minnesota
University of Minnesota alumni
Republican Party members of the United States House of Representatives from Minnesota
American blind people
20th-century American politicians
United States Marine Corps generals
United States Marine Corps reservists
United States Naval Aviators
United States Marine Corps personnel of World War I
United States Marine Corps personnel of World War II
Recipients of the Silver Star
Recipients of the Legion of Merit
Burials at Arlington National Cemetery